Huang Yaojiang (born March 21, 1982 in Guangdong) is a Chinese Sabre fencer.

At the 2004 Athens Olympics, he finished 27th in the Individual Sabre event and 7th in the Team Sabre event. He also competed at the 2008 Beijing Olympics.

Huang currently resides in Toronto, Ontario and coaches at his fencing club; Axis Fencing Club.

References

1982 births
Living people
Chinese male sabre fencers
Fencers at the 2004 Summer Olympics
Fencers at the 2008 Summer Olympics
Olympic fencers of China
Asian Games medalists in fencing
Fencers at the 2006 Asian Games
Asian Games gold medalists for China
Medalists at the 2006 Asian Games
Fencers from Guangzhou
20th-century Chinese people
21st-century Chinese people